Fort Branch is an unincorporated community in Logan County, West Virginia, United States.

Fort Branch is the home of Floodstage Stadium, an asphalt slab helipad that was converted by local schoolboys to become a multipurpose sports field.  A depression in the middle of the helipad notoriously collected and maintained a large puddle of rainwater, providing the inspiration for the name "Floodstage Stadium".

References 

Unincorporated communities in West Virginia
Unincorporated communities in Logan County, West Virginia
Coal towns in West Virginia